Presidential elections were held in El Salvador on 16 February 1903. General Pedro José Escalón was elected with 77.82 percent of the vote.

Results

President

Vice president

References

El Salvador
President
Presidential elections in El Salvador